The Lord Mayor of Leeds (until 1897 known as the Mayor of Leeds) is a ceremonial post held by a member of Leeds City Council, elected annually by the council.

By charter from King Charles I in 1626, the leader of the governing body of the borough of Leeds was an alderman, the first holder being Sir John Savile. A second charter, in 1661 from King Charles II, granted the title Mayor to Thomas Danby, after whom Thomas Danby College was named. In 1893 the County Borough of Leeds was granted city status, and in 1897 Queen Victoria conferred the title of Lord Mayor on James Kitson.

The first woman to have the post was Jessie Beatrice Kitson in 1942: she was elected following the death of Arthur Clarke shortly after his election.

In 2019, the council elected Leeds' first ever black Lord Mayor, Eileen Taylor. After serving as a Labour member of council since 2008, she was elected unanimously by fellow councillors at the authority's annual general meeting. Due to the COVID-19 pandemic, Taylor's term was extended for another municipal year until May 2021,  the first time a Lord Mayor has served for two municipal years since George Brett's original term of office (1947–48) was extended for a municipal year until 1949. Under the Representation of the People Act 1948, his term was extended until the first meeting held after the May 1949 council election.

Notable former Mayors include Benjamin Gott (1799), Sir George Goodman (1836), several of the Lupton family, Henry Rowland Marsden (1873) and Alf Cooke of the famous printworks (1890).

List of Lord Mayors
Source:

Notes

References

External links

 General information about current Lord Mayor

Leeds

Ceremonial officers in the United Kingdom